The 35th Street Bridge crosses the Kanawha River in Charleston, West Virginia, in the United States. It connects Interstate 64/77 south
at Exit #98 with West Virginia Route 61 in northern Kanawha City.

Sources
Coleman West Virginia Atlas and Gazetteer

Road bridges in West Virginia
Kanawha River
Buildings and structures in Charleston, West Virginia